No Regrets is a television period drama produced by TVB. The drama is an indirect spin-off of the 2009 award-winning drama Rosy Business.

Cheng Family

Lau Family

Yeung Family

Tung Tai Company

Canton Police Bureau

Imperial Japanese Army

Other Cast

See also
No Regrets (TV series)
List of No Regrets episodes

References

No Regrets
No Regrets